The following buildings were added to the National Register of Historic Places as part of the Middleburg Multiple Property Submission (or MPS).

Notes

 Clay
National Register of Historic Places Multiple Property Submissions in Florida